Cesare Cadeo (2 July 1946 – 4 April 2019) was an Italian television presenter and journalist.

Biography 
He began working at Canale 5 in 1981, as a correspondent and business consultant, appearing in the following year in Gol, a football program led by Enzo Bearzot, and Superflash, alongside Mike Bongiorno. In 1983 he led Five Album with Sandra Mondaini, a sort of summary of the Channel 5 television season 1982–1983. At that time he was also a commentator on many programs and sporting events, realizing as a correspondent a series of special services for the Buongiorno Italia program. his television career was particularly linked to the Mediaset networks. The well-known face of TV, called the "gentleman of the small screen", was an emblem of television in the 1980s.

In 1984 he debuted as a conductor of Record, Super Record and Super Record Sport sports broadcasts on Channel 5, continuing to collaborate in the programs of Mike Bongiorno Superflash and Pentatlon. His experience as a sports journalist continued for the programs A year of sport and Cadillac and some sports sections for Buongiorno Italia and Studio 5. Also in this area, from 1989 to 1992 he conducted the second evening broadcast of Italia 1 Calciomania, alongside by Paola Perego and Maurizio Mosca.

In 1995 he was a regular guest on the Italia 1 Mai dire Gol program, acting as a surreal sent by a fake newsstand in connection with Gialappa's Band. In 1998 he conducted the program Fantasia on Canale 5, which was a quiz with the children in the spotlight.

It then passed to RAI.

He died on 4 April 2019 after a long illness.

References 

1946 births
2019 deaths
Italian male journalists
Italian television presenters
20th-century Italian journalists
21st-century Italian journalists
20th-century Italian male writers